The Blue and Gray Press is the University of Mary Washington's official weekly student newspaper. Founded as The Bullet in 1922, the editors of the paper changed the name to The Blue and Gray Press in 2018. Located in Fredericksburg, Virginia., the student publication is printed every Thursday, and distributed to the UMW Undergraduate campus. Its website  averages 500 hits per day and its circulation is approximately 4,000.

Awards 
The publication has received numerous awards from the Society of Professional Journalists and the Associated Collegiate Press and Newspaper Association of America Foundation.

Society of Professional Journalists
Mark of Excellence - 1st Place, 2003  
Mark of Excellence - 2nd Place, 2002 

Associated Collegiate Press and Newspaper Association of America Foundation
The Newspaperpacemaker Finalist Award - 1994

Name Change

In the summer of 2014, The Bullet announced on its Facebook page that the newspaper was being relaunched as The Blue and Gray Press. In an interview with Campus Reform, editor-in-chief Alison Thoet criticized The Bullet as a name that "propagated violence" and said, "In this day and age, no one really cares about the Civil War," referring to the previous name's allusion to Fredericksburg's history as a major battle site in the Civil War.

The name change was met with some controversy among the student body, alumni, and online as the story was reported on by news outlets and blogs, prompting the board to pen an open letter clarifying its reasoning: "The Blue & Gray Press is a symbol of the school it serves and the locale in which it publishes." Some alumni and students responded to the letter criticizing the board's decision to rename the paper after nearly a century as The Bullet. "I was a proud member of the class of '88. A bit less proud now," one commenter wrote. "Shame on you. Error and hypocrisy. Abandon history for political correctness stating reasons which are wrong to begin with."

Current editorial staff 

Editor-in-chief: Chris Markham
Managing editor: Tess Osmer
News editors: Emily Hollingsworth and Sarah Grammar
Viewpoints editor: Alex Spence
Life editor: Della Hethcox
Sports editor: Mikey Barnes
Photo editor: Alex Sakes
Online editor: Ethan Tobin
Business manager: David Concepcion
Advertising manager: Natalie Furman

References

External links
 

Student newspapers published in Virginia
University of Mary Washington
Publications established in 1922
1922 establishments in Virginia